Aubry is a given name and surname of French origin.

Aubry may also refer to:

Aubry, Ouest, village in Haiti
Aubry, Kansas, United States
Aubry Township, Johnson County, Kansas
Aubry v Éditions Vice-Versa Inc, a leading Canadian Supreme Court of Canada case on privacy rights in Quebec

See also
Aubrey (disambiguation)